The Buffel-class monitors were a pair of ironclad monitors built for the Royal Netherlands Navy in the 1860s. They had uneventful careers and were stricken from the Navy List in the late 1890s.  was scrapped in 1897, but  was hulked and converted into an accommodation ship in 1896. She was captured by the Germans during World War II, but survived the war. She became a museum ship in 1979.

Design and description
They displaced  and was fitted with a ram bow. Their crew initially consisted of 117 officers and enlisted men and then later increased to 159.

The ships had a pair of two-cylinder compound-expansion steam engines, each driving one  propeller, using steam from four boilers. They could only reach , however.

The Buffel-class monitors were armed with a pair of Armstrong  rifled, muzzle-loading guns mounted in the Coles-type gun turret. They were also equipped with four 30-pounder smoothbore guns. The gun turret was protected by  inches of armor and the armor thickness increased to  around the gun ports.

Ships

Service
The Dutch bought a license for the design of Buffel from Napier and built one sister ship in their own dockyard in Amsterdam. The ships had uneventful careers since the Netherlands was at peace during their active periods. Buffel was stricken in 1896 and became an accommodation ship on 11 June of that year. She was captured by the Germans during World War II, but survived the war. She became a museum ship in 1979 in the Maritime Museum Rotterdam. Guinea was stricken and sold for scrap in 1897.

See also 
 List of ironclads

Notes

References

External links
Photo-collection on Dutch ironclads
HNSA Web Page: HNLMS Buffel

Ironclad classes